In Chile, fondas (also called ramada or chingana) are places that sell food and beverages during the Fiestas Patrias in September.
One of the most famous fondas is La Grandiosa Bertita, which is located in O'Higgins Park in Santiago, Chile.

Fondas take place in towns and cities all over Chile and often include various aspects of Chilean folkloric culture, such as traditional music, a traditional dance called the Cueca, and a Chilean rodeo, which takes place in an arena called the ¨Media Luna¨. It is common to see people dressed as Huasos, with a straw hat and poncho.  
Traditional foods and drinks include Mote con huesillo, anticuchos (a meat skewer), and terremotos (earthquake, in Spanish), a drink made of pipeño wine, grenadine, and pineapple ice cream.  Another activity you can find at a Fonda are games.  At many fondas, there will be games such as throwing darts at balloons, throwing a wooden ring and land on the neck of an alcoholic beverage to win as a prize, and little pools where children can fish for prizes.

Chilean cuisine